POSCO
 POSCO India
 Posco Energy
 Protection of Children from Sexual Offences Act, 2012